Lönnberg is a Swedish surname.

Lönnberg may also refer to:

 Lönnberg Valley, in Antarctica

See also
Löhnberg, a community in Hesse, Germany
Lönneberga, a village in Småland, Sweden